OPR may refer to:

 Office of Planning and Research, an agency of the California government
 Office of Population Research, the oldest population research center in the United States
 Office of Professional Responsibility, part of the United States Department of Justice
 Office of Professional Responsibility (IRS), part of the United States Internal Revenue Service responsible for investigating suspected practitioner misconduct
 Office of Public Roads, a predecessor of the United States Federal Highway Administration
 Official Pattern Release, used by Trend Micro to refer to the definitions for their antivirus products
 Oregon Pacific Railroad (1880–94), in Oregon, United States
 Oregon Pacific Railroad (1997), in Oregon, United States
 Old Parochial Registers of the Church of Scotland
 Output Recordings, a British independent record label run by Trevor Jackson, between 1996–2006
 Outward Processing Relief, a 1989 U.K. statutory instrument
 Overall pressure ratio, the ratio of the stagnation pressure as measured at the front and rear of the compressor of a gas turbine engine
 Overland Park Regional Medical Center, a hospital in Overland Park, Kansas
 Overnight Policy Rate, an overnight interest rate set by Bank Negara Malaysia used for monetary policy direction
 Owner's project requirements, a foundational document for the design and commissioning of buildings; see New-construction building commissioning
 Rodrigues People's Organisation (Organisation du Peuple Rodriguais), a Mauritian political party

See also
 Operator (disambiguation)